Garston Ladies FC is a football club for girls and women, based at Bushey Sports Club (formerly known as the Metropolitan Police Sports Club) in Bushey, Hertfordshire. The club was formed in 1996 at Lea Farm School, Watford as Garston Girls FC and has grown rapidly to become the largest female-only club in Hertfordshire. In May 2002, Garston Girls joined forces with Everett Ladies to form Garston Ladies FC. The club was awarded the FA Charter Standard in December 2005 in recognition of its high standards. Garston Ladies has become increasingly successful, winning a number of county cups and league titles. A number of players have gone on to achieve England recognition including former England Under-23's goalkeeper Lauren Davey.

History 
Garston Ladies FC has been affiliated to the Hertfordshire FA since the club was formed. The club's junior teams (U18 and below) play in the Hertfordshire Girls Football Partnership League while the senior teams compete in the Beds & Herts County Girls & Women's Football League. For the 2015–2016 season, Garston Ladies re-branded its junior teams with the names of big cats to differentiate between different teams in the same age group.
 
In January 2013 Garston Ladies FC formed an informal partnership with local boys' youth team Bushey & Oxhey FC.

The 2011–2012 season proved to be the most successful in the club's history. Garston Ladies FC's ten junior teams won thirteen honours between them including three League titles, two League Cups, and two County Cups.  The U-10s became the third Garston Ladies team to complete the treble of League, League Cup and County Cup following in the footsteps of the U-13s (2009–2010) and the U-13 Mets (2010–2011).

In the 2012–2013 season, Garston Ladies FC ran ten junior teams and one senior team. The U-10s and the U-11 Mets were the club's most successful teams, winning five trophies between them. The U-11 Mets won the treble for the second year in a row, having won all three competitions at U-10 level in 2011–2012.

During the 2013–2014 season the U-12 Mets became the most successful team in the club's history, winning the treble (league, league cup and county cup) for the third season in a row and completing three seasons of competitive football without losing a game.

The club grew rapidly between 2013 and 2017 increasing from 10 to 27 squads. In the 2018–2019 season Garston Ladies FC ran 23 squads.

On 22 March 2014, Sky Sports News reporter Seb Walke visited Bushey Sports Club to interview Garston Ladies FC coaches, players and parents as part of their focus on grassroots football. The resulting news article was broadcast on Monday 24 March 2014.

On 11 August 2015, Garston Ladies FC were winners of the Audentior Award (Watford Borough Council's Civic Recognition and Award scheme) in the "Mayor's Sporting Achievement" category.

Honours 
Sources: County Cups |
Hertfordshire Girls Football League & Home Counties Girls League |
Greater London Women's League |
London & South Eastern Regional Women's League | Bedfordshire and Hertfordshire County Girls and Women's Football League

2018-2019

2017-2018 
Under 12 Wildcats (Managers - Andy Wells, Neil Cole & Scott Magill)
 Hertfordshire Girls Football Partnership League Under 12 Division Two Champions
 Hertfordshire Girls Football Partnership League Under 12 League Cup Finalists

Under 13 Tigers (Managers - Rich Bennett, Paul Humphrey & Alan Hines)
 Hertfordshire FA Under 13 County Cup Winners

Under 13 Panthers (Managers - Phil Broch, Greg Edmunds & Phil Bennell)
 Hertfordshire Girls Football Partnership League Under 13 League Shield Finalists

Under 14 Jaguars (Managers - Mike Webster & Dan Holding)
 Hertfordshire Girls Football Partnership League Under 14 League Cup Finalists

Under 15 Lionesses (Manager - Andy Cullinane)
 Hertfordshire FA Under 15 County Cup Winners

Under 15 Tigers (Managers - Lee Warwick & Adam Marsh)
 Hertfordshire Girls Football Partnership League Under 15 Division Two Champions
 Hertfordshire Girls Football Partnership League Under 15 League Cup Finalists

Under 16 Pumas (Managers - Leigh Edmunds, Andy Phillips & Jason Dale)
 Hertfordshire FA Under 16 County Cup Winners

Under 18 (Manager - Stuart Farrell)
 Hertfordshire Girls Football Partnership League Under 18 League Shield Winners

Second Team (Managers - Guy Scott, Paul Roberts & Daren Hart)
 Bedfordshire and Hertfordshire County Girls and Women's Football League Division Two Champions

 2016-2017 Under 11 Jaguars (Managers - Tesh Parmar & Lee Alexander) Hertfordshire Girls Football Partnership League Under 11 League Shield WinnersUnder 11 Wildcats (Managers - Andy Wells, Scott Magill & Neil Cole) Hertfordshire Girls Football Partnership League Under 11 League Shield FinalistsUnder 12 Tigers (Managers - Rich Bennett & Paul Humphrey) Hertfordshire Girls Football Partnership League Under 12 Division One Champions
 Hertfordshire Girls Football Partnership League Under 12 League Cup Winners
 Hertfordshire FA Under 12 County Cup WinnersUnder 12 Panthers (Managers - Phil Broch, Greg Edmunds & Phil Bennell) Hertfordshire Girls Football Partnership League Under 12 Division Three ChampionsUnder 13 Leopards(Managers - Mark Harrison, Gavin Moore & Paul Coleman) Hertfordshire Girls Football Partnership League Under 13 Division One Runners-upUnder 13 Jaguars (Managers - Mike Webster & Dan Holding) Hertfordshire Girls Football Partnership League Under 13 League Shield WinnersUnder 14 Lionesses (Managers - Sarah Lewis & Andy Cullinane) Hertfordshire Girls Football Partnership League Under 14 League Division One Runners-up
 Hertfordshire Girls Football Partnership League Under 14 League Shield WinnersUnder 15 Pumas (Managers - Leigh Edmunds & Andy Phillips) Hertfordshire FA Under 15 County Cup Winners
 Hertfordshire Girls Football Partnership League Under 15 League Shield WinnersUnder 16 (Managers - Samantha Gillings & Stuart Farrell) Hertfordshire Girls Football Partnership League Under 16 League Shield WinnersUnder 18 Jaguars (Managers - Ray Smith & Dave Annal) Hertfordshire Girls Football Partnership League Under 18 League Shield Finalists

 2015-2016 Under 11 Tigers (Managers - Rich Bennett & Paul Humphrey) Hertfordshire Girls Football Partnership League Under 11 League Cup WinnersUnder 12 Leopards (Managers - Mark Harrison & Gavin Moore) Hertfordshire FA Under 12 County Cup WinnersUnder 13 Tigers (Managers - Martin Jenman, Alistair Whiteford & Lee Warwick) Hertfordshire Girls Football Partnership League Under 13 League Shield FinalistsUnder 13 Lionesses (Managers - Sarah Lewis & Andy Cullinane) Hertfordshire FA Under 13 County Cup Finalists
 Hertfordshire Girls Football Partnership League Under 13 League Shield WinnersUnder 14 Panthers (Managers - Pete Sargent & Del Brimble) Hertfordshire Girls Football Partnership League Under 14 9v9 League Cup FinalistsUnder 14 Pumas (Managers - Leigh Edmunds, Andy Phillips & Jason Dale) Hertfordshire FA Under 14 County Cup Winners
 Hertfordshire Girls Football Partnership League Under 14 11v11 League Cup FinalistsUnder 15 (Managers - Samantha Gillings & Stuart Farrell) Hertfordshire FA Under 15 County Cup Finalists
 Hertfordshire Girls Football Partnership League Under 15 League Shield WinnersUnder 16 Jaguars (Managers - Ray Smith & Dave Annal) Hertfordshire Girls Football Partnership League Under 16 Division Two ChampionsUnder 18 Sharks (Managers - Guy Scott & Paul Roberts) Bedfordshire and Hertfordshire County Girls and Women's Under 18 League Runners-upFirst Team (Managers - Colin Sills & Mark Murphy) Bedfordshire and Hertfordshire County Girls and Women's Football League Openage League Cup Winners

 2014-2015 Under 11 Mets (Managers - Mark Harrison & Gavin Moore) Hertfordshire Girls Football Partnership League Under 11 League Shield WinnersUnder 12 Mets (Manager - Sarah Lewis) Hertfordshire Girls Football Partnership League Under 12 Division One Champions
 Hertfordshire Girls Football Partnership League Under 12 League Cup FinalistsUnder 13 Mets (Managers - Leigh Edmunds & Andy Phillips) Hertfordshire FA Under 13 County Cup Finalists
 Hertfordshire Girls Football Partnership League Under 13 League Cup WinnersUnder 14 (Manager - Samantha Gillings) Hertfordshire Girls Football Partnership League Under 14 Division Two Runners-upUnder 15 (Managers - Ray Smith & Dave Annal) Hertfordshire Girls Football Partnership League Under 15 League Shield FinalistsUnder 16 Sharks (Managers - Guy Scott & Paul Roberts) Bedfordshire and Hertfordshire County Girls and Women's Football League Under 16 League Cup Finalists96FC (Managers - Mark Denham, John Alexander, Darren Berryman & John Hastie) Bedfordshire and Hertfordshire County Girls and Women's Football League Division Three ChampionsSeniors (Managers - Colin Sills & Mark Murphy) Bedfordshire and Hertfordshire County Girls and Women's Football League Openage League Cup Winners

 2013-2014 Under 10 Mets (Managers - Mark Harrison & Gavin Moore) Hertfordshire Girls Football Partnership League Under 10 Trophy FinalistsUnder 11 Mets (Manager - Sarah Lewis) Hertfordshire Girls Football Partnership League Under 11 Division One Runners-upUnder 12 Mets (Managers - Leigh Edmunds & Andy Phillips) Hertfordshire Girls Football Partnership League Under 12 Division One Champions
 Hertfordshire FA Under 12 County Cup Winners
 Hertfordshire Girls Football Partnership League Under 12 League Cup WinnersUnder 13 (Manager - Samantha Gillings) Hertfordshire Girls Football Partnership League Under 13 League Shield FinalistsUnder 14 (Managers - Ray Smith & Dave Annal) Hertfordshire Girls Football Partnership League Under 14 League Cup FinalistsUnder 16 Mets (Managers - Darren Berryman & Dave Layman) Hertfordshire Girls Football Partnership League Under 16 Division One Runners-up
 Hertfordshire Girls Football Partnership League Under 16 League Shield Winners

 2012-2013 Under 10 (Manager - Sarah Lewis) Hertfordshire Girls Football Partnership League Under 10 Division One Champions
 Hertfordshire Girls Football Partnership League Under 10 League Cup WinnersUnder 11 Mets (Managers - Leigh Edmunds & Andy Phillips) Hertfordshire Girls Football Partnership League Under 11 Division One Champions
 Hertfordshire Girls Football Partnership League Under 11 League Cup Winners
 Hertfordshire FA Under 11 County Cup WinnersUnder 15 Mets (Managers - Darren Berryman & Dave Layman) Hertfordshire Girls Football Partnership League Under 15 Division One Runners-up
 Hertfordshire FA Under 15 County Cup FinalistsUnder 18 (Managers - Mark Denham & John Alexander) Hertfordshire Girls Football Partnership League Under 18 League Cup Finalists

 2011-2012 Under 10 (Managers - Leigh Edmunds & Andy Phillips) Hertfordshire Girls Football Partnership League Under 10 Division One Champions
 Hertfordshire Girls Football Partnership League Under 10 League Cup Winners
 Hertfordshire FA Under 10 County Cup WinnersUnder 11 Mets (Managers - Ray Smith & Dave Annal) Hertfordshire Girls Football Partnership League Under 11 Division One Runners-up
 Hertfordshire Girls Football Partnership League Under 11 League Cup WinnersUnder 12 (Managers - Steve Thomas & Martin Ralph) Hertfordshire Girls Football Partnership League Under 12 Division Two ChampionsUnder 13 (Managers - Guy Scott & Paul Roberts) Hertfordshire Girls Football Partnership League Under 13 League Cup Finalists
 Hertfordshire FA Under 13 County Cup FinalistsUnder 14 Mets (Manager - Dave Layman) Hertfordshire Girls Football Partnership League Under 14 Division One (11-a-side) Runners-up
 Hertfordshire Girls Football Partnership League Under 14 (11-a-side) League Cup Finalists
 Hertfordshire FA Under 14 County Cup WinnersUnder 14 Diamonds (Managers - Andy Chambers & John Hastie) Hertfordshire Girls Football Partnership League Under 14 (9-a-side) Champions
 Hertfordshire Girls Football Partnership League Under 14 (9-a-side) League Shield Finalists

 2010-2011 Under 10 (Managers - Ray Smith & Dave Annal) Hertfordshire Girls Football Partnership League Under 10 Division One Champions
 Hertfordshire Girls Football Partnership League Under 10 League Cup Finalists
 Hertfordshire FA Under 10 County Cup FinalistsUnder 13 Mets (Manager - Dave Layman) Hertfordshire Girls Football Partnership League Under 13 Division One Champions
 Hertfordshire Girls Football Partnership League Under 13 League Cup Winners
 Hertfordshire FA Under 13 County Cup WinnersSeniors 1st team (Manager - Colin Sills) Greater London Women's League Division One North Champions

 2009-2010 Under 10 (Managers - Steve Thomas & Martin Ralph) Hertfordshire Girls Football Partnership League Under 10 League Shield FinalistsUnder 11 Sharks (Managers - Guy Scott & Paul Roberts) Hertfordshire Girls Football Partnership League Under 12 (7-a-side) Division Two Runners-upUnder 12 Mets (Manager - Dave Layman) Hertfordshire Girls Football Partnership League Under 12 Division One Champions
 Hertfordshire Girls Football Partnership League Under 12 (9-a-side) League Cup Finalists
 Hertfordshire FA Under 12 County Cup WinnersUnder 12 Diamonds (Managers - Donna Ford & Karen Walter) Hertfordshire Girls Football Partnership League Under 12 League Shield FinalistsUnder 13 (Manager - Sarah Lewis) Hertfordshire Girls Football Partnership League Under 14 Division One Champions
 Hertfordshire Girls Football Partnership League Under 14 League Cup Winners
 Hertfordshire FA Under 13 County Cup WinnersUnder 14 (Managers - Mark Denham & John Alexander) Hertfordshire FA Under 14 County Cup Finalists

 2008-2009 Under 9 (Manager - Gary Porter) Home Counties Girls Football League Under 9 Runners-upUnder 11 (Manager - Dave Layman) Home Counties Girls Football League Under 11 Runners-up
 Home Counties Girls Football League Under 11 League Cup FinalistsUnder 12 (Manager - Sarah Lewis) Hertfordshire FA Under 12 County Cup WinnersSeniors 1st team (Manager - Colin Sills) London & South Eastern Regional Women's League Division One Champions

 2007-2008 Under 13 (Manager - Donna Sills) Home Counties Girls Football League Under 13 Division Two Champions
 Hertfordshire FA Under 13 County Cup FinalistsUnder 14 (Manager - Gary Waller) Home Counties Girls Football League Under 14 Division One Runners-up
 Hertfordshire FA Under 14 County Cup FinalistsUnder 16 Purples (Manager - Ray Smith) Home Counties Girls Football League Under 16 Division Two Runners-up

 2006-2007 Under 13 (Manager - Gary Waller) Hertfordshire FA Under 13 County Cup WinnersSeniors 2nd team (Manager - Keith Silver) Greater London Women's League Division Three North Champions

 2005-2006 Under 12 (Manager - Gary Waller) Hertfordshire FA Under 12 County Cup WinnersUnder 14 Purples (Manager - Ray Smith) Hertfordshire Girls Football League Under 14 Division Two Runners-upUnder 15 (Manager - Keith Silver) Hertfordshire Girls Football League Under 15 ChampionsSeniors 1st team (Manager - Colin Sills) Greater London Women's League Division One Champions
 Greater London Women's League Cup FinalistsSeniors 2nd team (Manager - Andy Roads) Greater London Women's Reserve League Division Two Champions

 2004-2005 Under 11 (Manager - Gary Waller) Hertfordshire Girls Football League Under 11 Division One Runners-upSeniors 1st team (Manager - Colin Sills) Greater London Women's League Division Three Champions
 Hertfordshire FA Women's County Cup Finalists

 2003-2004 Seniors 2nd team (Manager - John Johnston) Greater London Women's League Reserve Division Two Runners-up

 2002-2003 Under 12 (Managers - Pete Clark & Pat Duffy) Hertfordshire FA Under 12 County Cup Finalists

 2001-2002 Under 14 (Managers - Andy Roads & John Johnston)''
 Hertfordshire FA Under 14 County Cup Finalists

External links
 Garston Ladies FC official website
 Garston Ladies FC Facebook page
 Sky Sports News article about Garston Ladies, broadcast on 24 March 2014

References

Women's football clubs in England
1996 establishments in England